CONCACAF Boys' Under-15 Championship is a CONCACAF football competition for players under 15 years old. The competition took place for the first time in 2013. It takes place every two years. The most recent champions are Portugal, who won the 2019 edition. The next competition will be in 2021.

See also 
 CONCACAF Gold Cup
 CONCACAF Men's Olympic Qualifying Tournament
 CONCACAF Under-20 Championship
 CONCACAF Under-17 Championship

References

External links
Under 15s – Boys, CONCACAF.com

Under-15 association football
Under-15, Boys
Recurring sporting events established in 2013